Rati Tsinamdzghvrishvili (born 22 March 1988) is a former Georgian football player.

Career
He made his international debut for the Georgia national football team at the age of 17.

In 2006, he won the Georgian Cup with FC Ameri Tbilisi in the final of which he scored a beautiful header against FC Zestafoni.

Personal life
His last name, Tsinamdzghvrishvili, which takes 18 letters to spell in English and contains 13 consonants, has been found by most foreigners to be unpronounceable. So in most games, his name on the back of his shirt normally only reads Rati (his first name) instead of Tsinamdzghvrishvili, which would take two to three separate lines of readable-sized letters on the back of a football shirt.

Tsinamdzghvrishvili is an old Georgian noble name, of which Rati is a direct descendant. His family and grandfather, Ilia Tsinamdzghvrishvili, still live in the village of Tsinamdzghvriantkari (named after the Tsinamdzghvrishvilis) in the hills near the Georgian capital Tbilisi. This is where Rati spent a lot of his childhood.

His grandfather, Ilia, who is a retired PE teacher, and his uncle, Mamuka Tsinamdzghvrishvili, a successful Georgian wrestler, were the main influences in Rati's sporting upbringing.

External links

1988 births
Living people
Footballers from Georgia (country)
Footballers from Tbilisi
Georgia (country) international footballers
FC Zestafoni players
FC Chikhura Sachkhere players
FC Sasco players
Association football forwards
FC Ameri Tbilisi players